SerbianTV-America, Inc. is a wholly owned subsidiary of EUROWorldNetwork; the broadcaster's representative for North America; responsible for the overall marketing and distribution strategy of the media offering. The company broadcasts Serbian radio and television programming to the Serbian communities in Canada and the United States.

SerbianTV-America has launched two Serbian television channels and one Serbian radio channel.

Television channels
 RTS - Radio Television Serbia (RTS Sat)
 DMSat

Radio channels
 RTS - Radio Beograd

Availability
The SerbianTV-America programming is available in North America on the Galaxy-19 (DTH) direct-to-home satellite platform and on the NexTV-America Internet television platform. SerbianTV-America intends to be available on some of the major cable networks.

External links
 NEXTV-America
 NEXTV-Canada

Other links
 STN
 Intelsat
 Ethnic Channels Group
 Radio Television Serbia
 DMSAT

Television networks in the United States